Nateby railway station served the village Nateby in Lancashire, England. It was originally named Winmarleigh railway station after the landowner at that time and was renamed after his death in 1902. Originally only a halt with the platform on the southern side of the line, it received a passing loop in 1909 and a second platform on the northern side, and by 1910 it also had a goods siding with a cattle dock. Passenger services were withdrawn in 1930, and the station closed altogether in 1950.

References

Disused railway stations in the Borough of Wyre
The Fylde
Railway stations in Great Britain opened in 1870
Railway stations in Great Britain closed in 1872
Railway stations in Great Britain opened in 1875
Railway stations in Great Britain closed in 1930